Edward Jenner Steptoe (November 7, 1815 – April 1, 1865) was an officer in the United States Army who served in the Mexican-American War and the Indian Wars. He is primarily remembered for his defeat at the Battle of Pine Creek during the Spokane-Coeur d'Alene-Paloos War. It was at Pine Creek where Steptoe and 164 men were ambushed by over 1,000 Indian warriors. The battle, and the subsequent (successful) retreat, is also known as "the Steptoe Disaster."

History
Steptoe was born in Virginia and graduated from West Point on July 1, 1837. He first saw action in Florida fighting against the Seminoles.

From 1838 to 1842, Steptoe fought extensively in the Seminole War. During the Mexican-American War, he participated in the Siege of Vera Cruz, and fought in the Battles of Cerro Gordo, San Antonio Garita, Buena Vista, and Chapultepec. After Cerro Gordo he was promoted to brevet major, and following  Chapultepec he was promoted to brevet  lieutenant colonel.

In 1854 he was sent by the War Department to Utah to investigate the recent massacre of John W. Gunnison and his survey party. In particular he was to determine the truth of rumors that Mormons had colluded with the Indians in the ambush. Steptoe charged eight Paiute Indians for the attack and three were convicted of manslaughter. He did not uncover evidence of Mormon involvement.

Late in 1854, President Franklin Pierce offered Steptoe the governorship of the Utah Territory to replace Brigham Young. Steptoe did not receive the actual letter from Pierce until March 1855. By that time he had already decided to turn down the offer. Instead, he was promoted to Major of the newly formed 9th Infantry Regiment.

In May 1858, during the Spokane–Coeur d'Alene–Paloos War, a combined force of about 1,000 Coeur d’Alenes, Spokanes, and Palouses attacked and defeated a force of 164 US troops under Steptoe at the Battle of Pine Creek.

Steptoe was sent on sick leave after the battle, during which he was promoted to lieutenant colonel, and resigned due to ill health in November 1861. He died four years later in his home state of Virginia. He is buried in Lynchburg, Virginia, where his tombstone is marked: "Edward J. Steptoe, Lieut. Col., Army of the United States."

Geographic features named after Steptoe
Steptoe, Washington
Steptoe Butte
Steptoe Valley

See also
George Armstrong Custer
George Wright
Indian Wars
Battle of Pine Creek

Notes

References
 Biographical Annals of the Civil Government of the United States. During its first century; from original and official sources. By Charles Lanman. Washington, DC: James Anglim, 1876.
 Drake's Dictionary of American Biography. Including men of the time, containing nearly 10,000 notices of persons of both sexes, of native and foreign birth, who have been remarkable, or prominently connected with the arts, sciences, literature, politics, or history, of the American continent. By Francis S. Drake. Boston: James R. Osgood & Co., 1872.
 Encyclopedia of American Indian Wars, 1492-1890. By Jerry Keenan. Santa Barbara, CA: ABC-CLIO, 1997.

External links
Biography of Edward Steptoe (University of Utah — Utah History Encyclopedia)
 Johnson, Randall A., May 17, 1858. The Ordeal of the Steptoe Command (HistoryLink.org essay No. 8123)
 "Saturday is 150th anniversary of Battle of Steptoe" By NICHOLAS K. GERANIOS, AP Posted: 2008-05-17 17:35:15
 

American military personnel of the Mexican–American War
Members of the Aztec Club of 1847
United States Military Academy alumni
American people of the Indian Wars
1815 births
1865 deaths
People from Bedford County, Virginia
Military personnel from Virginia
United States Army officers